The Diocese of Bitetto (Latin Dioecesis Bitectensis) was a Roman Catholic diocese in Italy, located in the town of Bitetto in the province of Bari, Apulia, Italy. In 1818, it was suppressed to the Diocese of Termoli.

History
1100: Established as Diocese of Bitetto
1818 June 27: Suppressed to the Archdiocese of Bari
1968: Restored as Titular Episcopal See of Bitetto

Bishops

Diocese of Bitetto
Erected: 1100
Carlo Archamono (23 Mar 1422 – 1432 Died) 
...
Leonardo del Giudice (17 Apr 1452 – 1481 Died) 
Sulpicio Acquaviva d'Aragona (26 Apr 1482 – 17 Feb 1483 Appointed, Bishop of Conversano)
Vincenzo Pistacchio (3 Nov 1499 – 1518 Resigned)
Andreas Mozenicus (19 Jun 1522 – ) 
Giovanni Salviati (10 Jan 1532 – 5 Mar 1539 Resigned) 
Valeriano Muti (5 Jul 1599 – 15 Nov 1602 Appointed, Bishop of Città di Castello) 
Baldassarre Pusterla (7 Apr 1603 – 1605 Died) 
Livio Limatola (13 Mar 1606 – 1611 Died) 
Giulio Mattei (18 May 1611 – 1624 Died) 
Michael Masserotti (Misserotti), O.F.M. Conv. (26 Feb 1624 – 1630 Died) 
Sigismondo Taddei (8 Jan 1631 – 27 Nov 1641 Appointed, Bishop of Caiazzo) 
Marco Antonio Tomati (16 Dec 1641 – 1655 Resigned) 
Francesco Gaeta (Caieta) (30 Aug 1655 – 2 Mar 1669 Died) 
Gaspare Toralto (3 Jun 1669 – 16 Nov 1676 Appointed, Bishop of Tricarico) 
Giacomo Santoro (26 Apr 1677 – Nov 1683 Died) 
Francesco Onofrio Hodierna (24 Apr 1684 – 4 Jan 1717 Appointed, Bishop of Valva e Sulmona)
Gioacchino Francesco Caprini (Carpi) (24 Jan 1718 – 20 Apr 1729 Died) 
Lazzaro Sangiovanni (6 Jul 1729 – 5 Oct 1736 Died) 
Francesco Franco (19 Nov 1736 – 10 May 1745 Appointed, Bishop of Nicotera) 
Angelo Maria Marculli, O.S.A. (10 May 1745 – 6 Oct 1770 Died) 
Hyacinthus Maria Barberio, O.F.M. Conv. (4 Mar 1771 – 1 Jan 1798 Died)

See also
Catholic Church in Italy

References

Former Roman Catholic dioceses in Italy